The Marais des Cygnes River is a principal tributary of the Osage River, about  long, in eastern Kansas and western Missouri in the United States. Via the Osage and Missouri rivers, it is part of the watershed of the Mississippi River.

The name  means "Marsh of the Swans" in French (presumably in reference to the trumpeter swan which was historically common in the Midwest).

The river is notorious for flash flooding. It is referred to in the song "The River" by Chely Wright.  La Cygne, Kansas, in Linn County and Osawatomie, Kansas, in Miami County are gravely affected by its flooding.

Course
The Marais des Cygnes is formed about 1 mile north of Reading, Kansas, a city in northern Lyon County, by the confluence of Elm Creek and One Hundred Forty-Two Mile Creek, and flows generally east-southeastwardly through Osage, Franklin, Miami and Linn counties in Kansas, and Bates County in Missouri, past the Kansas towns of Melvern, Quenemo, Ottawa, Osawatomie and La Cygne and through the Marais des Cygnes National Wildlife Refuge.

In Osage County, Kansas, a U.S. Army Corps of Engineers dam causes the river to form Melvern Lake, which is the site of Eisenhower State Park.

Floods
The Marais des Cygnes River has a history of flooding. One of the first such floods that has been noted is the Great Flood of 1844 known as "Big Water" in Native American legend.

The Great Flood of 1951 happened in June and July 1951, killing 28 people and causing over $935 million damage (in 1951 dollars).  This flood also affected the Kansas, Neosho, and Verdigris river basins.

As a result of the 1951 flood, the U.S. Army Corps of Engineers built levees and flood control systems on the Marais des Cygnes in the 1960s, including massive freestanding gated floodwalls in Ottawa, Kansas. Main Street (Old U.S. Highway 59) in Ottawa has to be detoured or is simply closed down when the gates are shut.

Variant names
The United States Board on Geographic Names settled on "Marais des Cygnes River" as the name in 1971. According to the Geographic Names Information System, the river has also been known as:

See also
List of Kansas rivers
List of Missouri rivers
Battle of Marais des Cygnes

References

Columbia Gazetteer of North America entry
DeLorme (2003).  Kansas Atlas & Gazetteer.  Yarmouth, Maine: DeLorme.  .
DeLorme (2002).  Missouri Atlas & Gazetteer.  Yarmouth, Maine: DeLorme.  .

Rivers of Kansas
Rivers of Missouri
Rivers of Bates County, Missouri
Rivers of Linn County, Kansas
Rivers of Vernon County, Missouri
Tributaries of the Missouri River
Great Flood of 1951
Rivers of Franklin County, Kansas
Rivers of Lyon County, Kansas
Rivers of Miami County, Kansas
Rivers of Osage County, Kansas